Riggs Road is a light rail station that is currently under construction. It will be part of the Purple Line in Maryland. The station will be located at the intersection of Riggs Road and University Boulevard.

History 
The Purple Line system is under construction as of 2022 and is scheduled to open in 2026.

Station layout
The station consists of an island platform on the median of University Boulevard just east of Riggs Road.

References

Hyattsville, Maryland
Langley Park, Maryland
Purple Line (Maryland)
Railway stations in Prince George's County, Maryland
Railway stations scheduled to open in 2026
Transportation in Prince George's County, Maryland